Ziyād ibn ʿAbd Allāh ibn Yazīd ibn Muʿāwiya, commonly known as Abū Muḥammad al-Sufyānī was an Umayyad prince and a pretender to the Umayyad Caliphate, which had been overthrown by the Abbasid Caliphate in early 750. Abu Muhammad led a revolt against the Abbasids, but his forces were defeated and he fled to the Hejaz, where he was killed in the early part of the Abbasid caliph al-Mansur's reign.

Origins
Abu Muhammad was a member of the Umayyad family, the son of Abd Allah ibn Yazid and grandson of Caliph Yazid I. He was related to Caliph al-Walid II through the latter's aunt, Atika bint Yazid. He adopted the epithet "al-Sufyani" as both a reference to his descent from Caliph Mu'awiya ibn Abi Sufyan and a claim to being the early Islamic messianic figure, al-Sufyani. Abu Muhammad's messianic claim was embraced by many in Islamic Syria, particularly the people of Homs, who believed him to be a messiah-like figure who would destroy the rising Abbasid Caliphate. Umayyad Caliph Marwan II had Abu Muhammad imprisoned in Harran for much of the second half of his reign. Abu Muhammad did not escape his incarceration when other inmates broke out; those inmates were caught and killed by Harran's inhabitants. Marwan released Abu Muhammad after his defeat by the Abbasids at the Battle of the Zab in January 750.

Revolt
Later in 750, the Qaysi general, Abu al-Ward, launched a revolt to defeat the Abbasids, rallying his kinsmen and other Qaysis and disavowing his allegiance to the Abbasid governor of Syria, Abd Allah ibn Ali. Abu Muhammad joined the revolt as a leader of the Yaman tribal confederation of Homs and Palmyra. Abu Muhammad assumed political leadership of the revolt and issued a claim to leadership of the Umayyad Caliphate, reaching out for support from other Umayyad nobles. Abu al-Ward, meanwhile, served as the revolt's military commander, though this command was likely limited to the Qaysi troops, the Yamani troops being led by al-Asbagh ibn Dhu'ala al-Kalbi. Although the intent of the revolt was to combat the Abbasids, particularly their Khurasani soldiers, it became a joint Qaysi–Yamani effort to gain control of the Umayyad Caliphate.

Despite an initial victory against the Abbasids led by Abd al-Samad ibn Ali at Qinnasrin, Abu Muhammad's forces were defeated near Homs. In the latter battle, Abu al-Ward and many of his kinsmen and Qaysi soldiers were killed, while Abu Muhammad fled to Palmyra. The Abbasid commander Bassam ibn Ibrahim attempted and failed to capture Palmyra, but Abu Muhammad fled again, this time heading for the Hejaz (western Arabia). There, he found a safe haven near Mount Uhud. Abu Muhammad and his family remained in Arabia until they were tracked down and killed during Caliph al-Mansur's reign. Abu Muhammad's revolt, though short-lived, was the most significant threat the Abbasids faced in the period immediately following their successful revolution against the Umayyads. The revolt motivated the Abbasids to track down and eliminate other remnants of the Umayyad dynasty.

Sufyani
The origin, role and identity of the Sufyani in Islamic tradition and Abu Muhammad's place in it is much debated. In the local Syrian context, the Sufyani was seen as a deliverer who would herald a golden age. But in Shi'ite tradition, due to his descent from Abu Sufyan—originally an opponent of Muhammad and the father of Mu'awiya, who was responsible for the downfall of Ali—he was an anti-Muslim figure, a sort of Islamic Antichrist and the opponent of the Mahdi. Scholars have debated the roots of this figure, with some claiming the existence of the legend already during Umayyad times. Henri Lammens suggested that Abu Muhammad was the origin of the legend, and that Syrians believed that after his execution he went into hiding—much like the Shi'ite Mahdi—and would reappear. Wilferd Madelung championed the view that the Sufyani was from the beginning an anti-Mahdi figure, and that he only acquired positive connotations in Syria at a later date. Several later rebels in Syria, from Abu Harb al-Mubarqa in the 840s all the way up to the 15th century, claimed the mantle of the Sufyani.

References

Bibliography

 

Umayyad dynasty
8th-century deaths
Rebels from the Abbasid Caliphate
Syria under the Abbasid Caliphate
750s conflicts
People of the Third Fitna
8th-century Arabs